Eutrapelia comes from the Greek for 'wittiness' (εὐτραπελία) and refers to pleasantness in conversation, with ease and a good sense of humor. It is one of Aristotle's virtues, being the "golden mean" between boorishness (ἀγροικία) and buffoonery (βωμολοχία). When construed narrowly, eutrapelia is associated with an emotion in the same manner modesty and righteousness are associated with emotion, while it is not tied to any particular emotion when construed in wider terms, and is classified with truthfulness, friendliness, and dignity in the category of mean-dispositions that cannot be called pathetikai mesotetes. 

For a while, eutrapelia mostly came to signify jokes that were obscene and coarse. The word appears only once in the New Testament, in Ephesians 5:4, where it is translated as, "coarse jesting", in the NIV.

The influential Medieval philosopher, Thomas Aquinas (1225–1274), viewed eutrapelia in a positive light, again, favoring the ancient Aristotelian notion that it is constituted by mental relaxation and honorable fun. In Summa Theologica, Aquinas made it the virtue of moderation in relation to jesting. By the second half of thirteenth century, the concept was considered a state of judicious pleasure and returned to being considered a virtue by commentators. 

The term, eutrapely, is derived from eutrapelia and, since 1596, shares the original meaning of wittiness in conversations.

References

 
 Hoffmann, Tobias. “Eutrapelia: The Right Attitude toward Amusement.” In Mots médiévaux offerts à Ruedi Imbach, edited by Iñigo Atucha, Dragos Calma, Catherine König-Pralong, and Irene Zavattero, 267–77. F.I.D.E.M. Textes et études du moyen âge. Porto: Fédération Internationale des Instituts d’Études Médiévales, 2011. 

Philosophy of Aristotle
Virtue